Passport to Europe was an American television show on the Travel Channel from 2004 to 2006.  The show follows the bubbly and upbeat television host Samantha Brown around Europe visiting various popular European cities, including prime travel destinations such as Berlin, Munich, Amsterdam, Venice, Florence, Rome, Paris and London, as well as smaller cities such as Stratford-upon-Avon, Penzance and Oxford in England.

In the course of each show, Brown tours each city and interacts with the town's locals (occasionally with the use of subtitles for the viewer, even for English-speaking countries, such as Scotland).  She also visits local landmarks - including popular restaurants and shopping locales - and educates viewers on events in the city's history.

The show was nominated for a Daytime Emmy in 2006 in the same category that the Travel Channel series Great Hotels went on to win.

In July 2006, Brown announced that Passport to Europe had officially wrapped, and that Passport to Latin America would start filming in September 2006.

Passport to Europe won an Emmy award for "Outstanding Lifestyle Directing." Brown was quoted saying:
"We got the news last night (6/14) — we were in our hotel bar having a wrap of Mexico City drink. Many of us had retired to our hotel rooms to pack for leaving the next day or just go to bed. Joan McCord (Director) got the news and so of course we changed from our PJ’s back into our clothes and went back down to the bar so we could order a couple of bottles of Champagne. We are all absolutely thrilled…beyond thrilled to be recognized this way. PineRidge and Travel Channel now have TWO EMMYs for Great Hotels and Passport to Europe. Not bad at all."

Brown also hosts Great Hotels.

Places visited

Aix-en-Provence, France 
Amalfi Coast, Italy 
Amsterdam, Holland 
Athens, Greece 
Barcelona, Spain 
Bath, United Kingdom 
Bavaria, Germany 
Berlin, Germany 
Bologna, Italy 
Brittany, France 
Brussels, Belgium 
Cannes, France 
Cornwall, United Kingdom 
Copenhagen, Denmark 
County Cork, Ireland
Crete, Greece  
Dublin, Ireland 
Edinburgh, United Kingdom 
Florence, Italy 
Geneva, Switzerland
Glasgow, United Kingdom 
Helsinki, Finland 
Innsbruck, Austria 
Interlaken, Switzerland 
Inverness, United Kingdom 
Lisbon, Portugal 
London, United Kingdom 
Lyon, France 
Madrid, Spain 
Majorca, Spain 
Marseilles, France 
Milan, Italy
Monte Carlo, Monaco 
Munich, Germany 
Mykonos, Greece 
Naples, Italy 
Normandy, France 
Oxford, United Kingdom 
Paris, France 
Penzance, United Kingdom 
Prague, Czech Republic 
Rome, Italy 
Reykjavík, Iceland 
Salzburg, Austria 
St. Moritz, Switzerland 
Santorini, Greece 
Seville, Spain 
Stockholm, Sweden 
Stratford-upon-Avon, United Kingdom 
Torino, Italy 
Tuscany, Italy 
Verona, Italy
Vienna, Austria 
Venice, Italy 
Zurich, Switzerland

Media
Four DVDs were released:

Passport to Europe with Samantha Brown: England, Ireland and Scotland. It includes the following episodes:

English Countryside (Bath & Cotswolds)
Classic London
London Now
Ireland Coast (County Cork & County Kerry)
Dublin, Ireland
Edinburgh, Scotland

Passport to Europe with Samantha Brown: Seven Fabulous Cities. It includes the following episodes:

Brussels, Belgium 
Prague, Czech Republic 
Amsterdam, Holland 
Barcelona, Spain 
Madrid, Spain 
Seville, Spain 
Lisbon, Portugal

Passport to Europe with Samantha Brown: Germany, Switzerland and Austria . It includes the following episodes:

Bavaria (Mittenwald & Oberammergau), Germany 
Berlin, Germany 
Munich, Germany 
Innsbruck, Austria 
Salzburg, Austria 
Vienna, Austria 
Interlaken, Switzerland 
St. Moritz, Switzerland 
Zurich, Switzerland

Passport to Europe with Samantha Brown: France and Italy . It includes the following episodes:

Cannes and Nice, France
Paris, France (2 episodes)
Monte Carlo, Monaco 
Amalfi Coast, Italy 
Florence, Italy
Naples, Italy 
Rome, Italy

References

External links
 
 Passport to Europe with Samantha Brown official website.

Travel Channel original programming
2004 American television series debuts
2006 American television series endings